Ekaterina Andreyevna Krasnova (née Beketova; ; 17 [29] August 1855 — 4 [16] May 1892) was a Russian poet, writer, and translator. She was born in Moscow into a family of Russian nobility, the daughter of botanist Andrey Beketov. She also wrote children's literature and invested much attention on her nephew Alexander Blok. In 1892, she died of eclampsia following a medically mandated abortion.

References 

1892 deaths
1855 births
Russian women poets
Writers from Moscow
19th-century poets from the Russian Empire
19th-century women writers from the Russian Empire
Deaths in childbirth